The highest-selling albums and mini-albums in Japan are ranked in the Oricon Weekly Chart, published by Oricon Style magazine. The data is compiled by Oricon based on each album's weekly physical sales.

Chart history

See also
2012 in music

References

Number-one albums
Japan
2012